Vaiea United FC is a Niue soccer club from Vaiea that currently competes in the Niue Soccer Tournament, the top tier competition on the island. The club plays its home matches at the Vaiea Ground. With five league championships, it is Niue's most successful soccer club.

History
After a long hiatus, the Niue Soccer Tournament was resurrected in 2021 under the newly formed Niue Football Association. Vaiea earned the championship that season.

Honours 
Niue Soccer Tournament: 2010, 2011, 2012, 2015, 2021

References

Soccer clubs in Niue